Western Khmer, also known as Cardamom Khmer or Chanthaburi Khmer, is the dialect of the Khmer language spoken by the Khmer people native to the Cardamom Mountains on both sides of the border between western Cambodia and eastern Central Thailand (Chanthaburi Province).  Developing in an historically isolated region, Western Khmer is the only dialect of modern Khmer to conserve the Middle Khmer phonation contrast of breathy voice versus modal voice that has been all but lost in the other dialects.

Phonology

Consonants

 in loan words

Vowels

References

Languages of Cambodia
Languages of Thailand
Khmer language